Plan Panni Pannanum is a 2021 Indian Tamil-language romantic comedy film directed by Badri Venkatesh, produced by Rajesh Kumar and Sinthan L from Positive Print Studios. The film’s title was taken from a dialogue spoken by Vadivelu. The story is written by A.C Karunamurthy (Karnamurthy), dialogues by Radhakrishnan  and the film stars Rio Raj and Ramya Nambeesan. The music for the film is composed by Yuvan Shankar Raja while cinematography is handled by Rajasekar and editing is done by Sam RDX. The first look motion poster of the film was released by Sivakarthikeyan and Vijay Sethupathi

Plot
Two friends, Sembi (Rio Raj) and Raju (Bala Saravanan), end up kidnapping a girl (Ramya Nambeesan) to know about the whereabouts of one of their sister (Poornima Ravi), who has eloped with her boyfriend Bharath Raj (Siddharth Vipin).A bride-seeing event that spoofs Paasa Malar, a driver (Tiger Garden Thangadurai) who offers to give the protagonists a short ride ending up travelling with them all the way to Kodaikanal, a guy who shoots videos of men in a state of undress and blackmails them, the manager (M. S. Bhaskar) of a glamorous star (Anaika Soti), who is taken for a ride by the friends, who owe him money, a monologue by the sister, which is amusing, even though its representation of a young woman from a supposedly downmarket locality like Royapuram is troubling.

Cast

Production 
The principal production of the film started with a formal Pooja on 17, October 2019 with the main cast and crew being present. Rio Raj, a television artist was selected to play the male lead. The film's shoot happened in Chennai, Vagamon, Idukki, Gangtok and Kupup located near China border. The shoot was wrapped upM. S. Bhaskar signed to appear as a astrologer in the movie. The Movie was completed in three schedules with less than 45 shooting days. The film's Post production works began thereafter.

Release

Home Media
The satellite rights of the film were sold to Star Vijay and the streaming rights acquired by Disney+ Hotstar.

Music 
The music and score is composed by Yuvan Shankar Raja. The audio rights have been acquired by Sony Music India. The lyrics for the songs are written by Arunraja Kamaraj and Niranjan Bharathi. The first single track, "Ennodu Vaa" was released on 27 February 2020. The song, was released live on sun music and was uploaded on YouTube at the same time.

"Ramya Nambeesan, who has previously sung in Natpuna Ennanu Theriyuma and Damaal Dumeel, has picked up the mic again for her upcoming film, Plan Panni Pannanum. With music by Yuvan Shankar Raja, Ramya has sung a folk song in the film."

The audio launch happened on 11 March 2020 at Sathyam Cinemas. The trailer of the film was released alongside the audio to the press, followed by an online launch.

References 

2021 black comedy films
Indian black comedy films
Films scored by Yuvan Shankar Raja
Films shot in Kerala
Films shot in Munnar
Films shot in Chennai
Films shot in Sikkim